Jamal Abdi Hassan Abdullah (born 10 October 1972) is a Qatari middle-distance runner. He competed in the 3000 metres steeplechase at the 1992 Summer Olympics and the 1996 Summer Olympics.

References

External links
 

1972 births
Living people
Athletes (track and field) at the 1992 Summer Olympics
Athletes (track and field) at the 1996 Summer Olympics
Qatari male middle-distance runners
Qatari male steeplechase runners
Olympic athletes of Qatar
Place of birth missing (living people)
Athletes (track and field) at the 1994 Asian Games
Asian Games competitors for Qatar